The Battle of Atakpamé (1764) was an armed confrontation between the Ashanti Empire and neighboring Akan Allies under the leadership of the Kingdom of 
Akyem who joined up with the Oyo Empire and the Kingdom of Dahomey in and around Atakpamé in Togo.

Prelude
During the 18th century, the Ashanti Empire was beset by a host of rebellions. This was due in large part, to the empire's policy of allowing conquered rulers a fair amount of autonomy as long as they paid tribute and provided military contingents when ordered. The asantethene during this period was Kusi Oboadum, who had ascended the throne in 1750. During his reign, the southern states under Asante's influence such as Denkyira, Wassa, Twifo and Akyem became openly hostile and threatened the empire's commercial routes to the coast. This was not only a threat to Asante's commercial interests but to its national security, since its supply of firearms came from the coast.

Casus belli
In 1763, the Asante vassal kingdom of Akyem under its King  Pobi Asomaning II, the Okyenhene, made contact with the Kingdom of Dahomey while planning a rebellion with other dissidents within the empire, including the Kwahu and Brong. Meanwhile, the bantamahene, one of the major Asante military officers, had been relentlessly pressuring Asantehene Kusi Oboadum for war. Bantamahene Adu Gyamera had even gone so far as to threaten the ruler's impeachment. The asantehene did not order an invasion, however, until learning that the Akyem had sought out aid from the Oyo Empire.

The battle
Sometime in 1764, the Ashanti army marched out to invade the Dahomey. The exact size of either force is known. What historians are sure of is that the Ashanti army was ambushed in or near Atakpamé in what is now Togo. A force of Dahomean infantry, including the kingdom's elite Ahosi corps of female soldiers, as well as levies from the Oyo Empire, were able to hold the Ashanti army to a standstill. During the battle, the Juabenhene (head of the royal clan of Oyoko) was killed. The Ashanti army never reached Dahomey and was forced to retreat.

Aftermath
News reached European merchants trading with the alliance had inflicted a severe defeat on the Ashanti. The consequences were far reaching in that the unpopular asantethene was removed and replaced by the more youthful Osei Kwadwo. There were fewer documented confrontations between Ashanti and Dahomey in the early 19th century, but peace was the norm between them. This particular battle caused Asanteman to  refocus its foreign policy back to its original goals rather than spreading itself too thin.

See also
 History of Togo
 Ashanti Empire
 Kingdom of Dahomey
 Oyo Empire

Footnotes

Sources

Military history of Africa
Atakpamé
Ashanti Empire
Kingdom of Dahomey
Military history of Togo
Atakpamé
1764 in Africa
Oyo Empire